The Brazilian Industrial Social Services (SESI in Portuguese) is a private Brazilian not-for-profit institution that operates throughout the country. It was set up on July 1, 1946 stating its aim to be "promoting social welfare, cultural development and improving the lives of workers and their families and the communities they live in".

Paulo Freire worked in SESI in Pernambuco from 1947 to 1958. During that time in SESI he served first as Director of the Division of Public Relations, Education, and Culture, and then as superintendent.

Role
The roles of SESI and the National Industrial Apprenticeships Association(SENAI) were set out in Acts 4.048, of 22 January 1942, 4.936, of 7 November 1942, 6.246, of 5 February 1944 and 9.403, of 25 June 1946. According to those bills, the roles referred to are owed by industrial establishments classified as such by the National Confederation of Industry (CNI), along the lines that they are required to pay a monthly contribution for the funding of social work among industrial workers and their dependents for the setting up and maintenance of training schools.

Regional departments
SESI maintains a presence in every state in Brazil and in the Federal District of Brasília through a chain of regional departments, each of which has jurisdiction and technical, financial and administrative autonomy. Its function is the delivery of social services in the areas of health, education, leisure, culture, food and the promotion of citizenship, having in mind improvements in quality of life among industrial workers and their families. Besides providing services in their activity centres and operational units, the regional departments develops operations within industry and in harmony with the needs and expectations of the workers. Various projects also benefit the community through partnerships and agreements with international and national governmental and private institutions.

Theatre

 Osmar Rodrigues Cruz, theatre director, founded the SESI Popular Theatre Company in 1963 and presented the play 'Murderous City' (Cidade Assessina) which took Brazilian theatre by storm. 
 Tickets were distributed for free, but because of big interest, they were limited.
 Osmar wanted to offer a quality theater, helping to train disadvantaged sections of the public.

See also
Serviço Nacional de Aprendizagem Industrial (SENAI)

References

Social work organisations in Brazil
Welfare in Brazil
Organizations established in 1946